The 1923 Bowling Green Normals football team was an American football team that represented Bowling Green State Normal School (later Bowling Green State University) as a member of the Northwest Ohio League (NOL) during the 1923 college football season. In its first and only season under head coach Ray B. McCandless, the team compiled a 3–5 record and was outscored by a total of 131 to 68. Robert A. Younkin was the team captain.

Schedule

References

Bowling Green
Bowling Green Falcons football seasons
Bowling Green Normals football